Richard Charles Mulligan (March 18, 1918 – December 15, 1992) was a Major League Baseball left-handed pitcher, chiefly in relief. He played parts of four seasons with the Washington Senators (1941), Philadelphia Phillies (1946), and Boston Braves (1946 – 1947).

Mulligan served with the US Army Air Force from 1942–46 during World War II.

References

External links

1918 births
1992 deaths
People from Swoyersville, Pennsylvania
Baseball players from Pennsylvania
Major League Baseball pitchers
Boston Braves players
Washington Senators (1901–1960) players
Philadelphia Phillies players
Trenton Senators players
Federalsburg A's players
Hartford Chiefs players
San Diego Padres (minor league) players
Milwaukee Brewers (minor league) players
Dallas Eagles players
Houston Buffaloes players
United States Army Air Forces personnel of World War II